Alexandre de Vincent de Mazade (or Mazarade; 1735–1808) was a French soldier who was twice acting governor of the French colony of Saint-Domingue between 1787 and 1789.

Early years

Alexandre de Vincent de Mazade was born in Saint-Péray, Ardèche, France, in 1735.
His parent were Louis  de Vincent de Mazade (died 1779) and Françoise Victoire de Geys de Montguillard.
On 31 December 1779 he married Marie Thérèse Sophie Chappotin (born 1757) in Port-au-Prince, Saint-Domingue.
His wife was a Creole, so he belonged to the class of proprietors of the colony.
He owned shares in a sugar company in Terrier-Rouge and several coffee plantations in the Western Province.

Vincent de Mazade became a maréchal de camp.
He was made a knight of the Order of Saint Louis.
In the 1780s he was a brigadier in the king's armies, second-in-command in Port-au-Prince, commander of the western part of the island and commander of the French Leeward Islands (Îles Sous-le-Vent).
He had a good military reputation.

Governor of Saint-Domingue

Vincent succeeded César Henri, comte de La Luzerne in November 1787, as acting governor.
He was  Governor of Santo Domingo from November 1787 to July 1789.
François Barbé-Marbois was the intendant, or head of civil administration, during this period.
One of the problems Vincent and Marbois had to handle was the extreme cruelty that the planter Lejeune inflicted on his slaves, in violation of the laws of Saint-Domingue.
A conviction could be viewed as an indictment of the institution of slavery, and would humiliate the planters in the eyes of their slaves.
There would be a danger that the slaves would refuse to obey orders, and the whole system would break down.
This was not an isolated incident.
They ordered deportation of the planter Maguero for barbarities against his slaves, and wrote that there were other cases that were even more serious, but did not have the "clarity" afforded by the planter's confession.

Marie-Charles du Chilleau, the Marquis du Chilleau, was appointed Governor General in March 1788.
He did not arrive in the colony until the end of the year, and remained only until the beginning of July 1789.
Vincent was replaced by Antoine de Thomassin de Peynier in August 1789.

Later activity

Vincent de Mazade was commander of the northern part of the colony in 1789.
He tolerated the sedition of Jean-Jacques Bacon de la Chevalerie, but dissolved the insurrectionist Assembly of Saint-Marc, or Léopardins, in 1790.

Vincent de Mazade died in Saint-Thomas, Haute-Garonne in 1808.

Notes

Citations

Sources

1753 births
1808 deaths
Governors of Saint-Domingue